Cyana luchoana is a moth of the family Erebidae. It was described by Timm Karisch in 2003 and is endemic to the Democratic Republic of the Congo.

References

luchoana
Moths described in 2003
Insects of the Democratic Republic of the Congo
Moths of Africa
Endemic fauna of the Democratic Republic of the Congo